Jeremiah Hurley (1891 – 2 February 1943) was an Irish Labour Party politician, trade unionist and national schoolteacher.

Hurley was a member of Cork Corporation from 1931 to 1938, having been nominated by Cork Workers' Council. He was an unsuccessful candidate for the Cork Borough constituency at the 1932 and 1933 general elections. 

He was elected to Dáil Éireann as a Labour Party Teachta Dála (TD) for the Cork South-East constituency at the 1937 general election. He was re-elected at the 1938 general election. 

He was president of the Irish Trades Union Congress in 1938. He died in 1943 during the term of the 10th Dáil but no by-election was held.

References

1891 births
1943 deaths
Labour Party (Ireland) TDs
Members of the 9th Dáil
Members of the 10th Dáil
Politicians from County Cork
Irish schoolteachers
Irish trade unionists